Crocus Hill is the highest point of Anguilla, a British overseas territory in the Caribbean, with an elevation of . The hill is located near The Valley, Anguilla's capital. Crocus Bay (west of the hill) was named after Crocus Hill.

See also
Geography of Anguilla

References

External links
  Crocus Hill Map — Satellite Images of Crocus Hill, Maplandia

Crocus Hill
Hills of the Caribbean